Room 10 is a 2006 short film co-directed by Jennifer Aniston and Andrea Buchanan and starring Robin Wright.

Plot
During one of her shifts in the emergency department of a hospital, Frannie Jones (Wright), an overworked nurse, meets a couple in Room 10 where the woman is close to death.

Cast
 Robin Wright as Frannie Jones
 Kris Kristofferson as Howard Davis
 Leonardo Nam as Shane Woo
 Brooke D'Orsay as Jessica Mills
 Gwen McGee as Kelly Jackson
 Bonita Friedericy as Psych Patient
 Patricia Place as June Davis

Reviews
The film received good reviews from critics. Indiewire'''s Daniel Walber wrote, "Room 10'' is a great example of the constrained and creative art of the short film."

Accolades

Notes

External links
 

2006 films
2006 short films
American short films
2000s English-language films